The Life Academy is a 2017 South Korean television program. It airs on tvN on every Sunday at 21:20 (KST) beginning 14 May 2017. From 8 June 2017, the show will air on every Thursday 20:10 KST. The show is a life growth variety show in the form of a school day, in which the show assumes "life also requires schooling". In each lesson, the show invites special guests of various professions as teachers to share contents outside of the textbook. The show teaches through problem-based learning to engage with the viewers.

Cast

Students
 Kim Yong-man
 Jeong Jun-ha
 Ahn Jung-hwan
 Jeon Hye-bin
 Lee Hong-gi
 Kwak Dong-yeon

Episodes

2017

External links
 

South Korean reality television series